Darrell W. Crate (born 1967) is an American investor, private equity manager, and philanthropist. He is currently the managing principal of Easterly, a private investment firm he founded in 2009 in Beverly, Massachusetts.

A native of New York City, Crate attended Bates College in Lewiston, Maine before attending Columbia Business School in New York City. He began his career with Chase Manhattan Bank and Chase Manhattan Securities. His last assignment as the managing director of Financial Institutions Group based in London. Soon after he was asked to join Affiliated Managers Group where he helped to scale the business from 1998 to 2011, as Chief Financial Officer.

After departing AMG, Crate founded Easterly, where he has focused on a number of ventures, including founding a publicly-traded REIT, sponsoring a SPAC and building an asset management platform which owns stakes in third-party investment management businesses and assists them with their strategic growth.

Early life and education 
Crate was born in New York City in 1967. Crate received his Bachelor of Arts in economics from Bates College in 1989 and his M.B.A. from Columbia Business School in 1995.

Investment career

Chase bank 
Crate began his career with Chase Manhattan and Chase Manhattan Securities in New York. His last assignment as the managing director of the Financial Institutions Group based in London, focusing exclusively on investment management firms in England, Spain, France, Italy, Germany and the Benelux region.

Affiliated Managers Group

As chief financial officer 
From 1998 to 2011, he served as the chief financial officer of Affiliated Managers Group a publicly traded asset management holding company. During his tenure at AMG, assets under management grew from $50 billion to over $340 billion through mutual fund, pension, and high-net-worth accounts globally, with over half of its clients domiciled outside the United States. During his tenure as CFO, the firm acquired interests in over 30 firms including Third Avenue Management, ValueAct Capital, AQR Capital Management, BlueMountain Capital Management and Tweedy, Browne Company. Over this same period, the company’s valuation increased materially, from $450 million to $6 billion

Easterly

As founder 
In 2009, Crate founded Easterly Capital, LLC, a firm based in Beverly, Massachusetts, that builds operating businesses to gain exposure to the growth in both asset management and non-bank finance sectors.  He joined the firm full-time in 2011.

As chairman 
In February 2015, Crate became the chairman of Easterly Government Properties, Inc., a publicly traded REIT on the New York Stock Exchange that is focused primarily on the acquisition, development and management of Class A commercial properties that are leased to U.S. Government agencies that serve essential functions. According to Business Wire, Crate became the chairman of Easterly Acquisition Corp., a publicly traded blank check company in July 2015.

In March 2019, Easterly purchased the institutional investment business of Levin Capital Strategies, establishing Levin Easterly Partners, a long-only asset manager. Levin Easterly had approximately $6.1 billion in assets under management upon closure of the transaction.  Levin Easterly is a fundamental, contrarian value investment management firm focusing on US Large and All Cap Value strategies based in New York and New Canaan, CT. One area of focus for the firm has been special purpose acquisition companies (SPACs). They are one of the most experienced investors in these vehicles, with a track record of investing in SPACs that spans over a decade.

In May 2020, Easterly acquired an equity interest in James Alpha Advisors, LLC, a boutique asset management firm specializing in Global REITs, Structured Credit and Hedged Equity. In addition, the firm provides a platform of liquid alternative portfolios for institutional and individual investors. James Alpha Advisors had over $1.1 billion in assets under management at the time of the transaction.

Easterly Alternatives is the alternatives-focused arm of Easterly and has raised more than $500 million in private and platform vehicles in sectors including real estate, healthcare and transportation. Easterly Alternatives recently has launched a SPAC Fund, in which it will invest in the best new-issue SPAC IPOs that come to market.

Personal life 
Crate currently lives in Florida, Maine and Hamilton, Massachusetts.

He is involved with a number of non-profit, political, and charitable organizations. He has been a trustee of Bates College since 2003 and served on the college's advancement and investment committees. On February 8, 2016, the college announced that Crate was among seven families to donate $19 million to endow professorships and launch the college’s new digital and computational studies program. Crate also serves as a trustee of Think of Us, a not-for-profit technology platform with the ultimate goal of helping foster youth successfully transition into a prosperous adulthood.

Crate currently serves as Vice Chairman of the Aircraft Owners and Pilots Association (AOPA). A licensed private pilot since 1993, Crate has more than 6,000 flight hours and has flown his single-engine TBM plane to all of the 48 continental states. He also serves on the advisory counsel to the National Park Foundation. He has a particular focus and interest in the National Parks located in Maine, North Carolina and Montana.

Crate is a member of the Advisory Council of the Robert F. Kennedy Children's Action Corps (2006), a national leader in child welfare and juvenile justice programs and services. In 2019, the RFK Children’s Action Corps honored Crate with its prestigious "Robert F. Kennedy Embracing the Legacy Award” for his work on behalf of at-risk youth. Crate also served as a Trustee of Think of Us, a not-for-profit technology platform with the ultimate goal of helping foster youth successfully transition into a prosperous adulthood.

Other interests include serving as a trustee of Islesboro Island Trust (2002), Adams Memorial Foundation (2011),  Ethel Walker School (2015) IRYS School of Technology and Trades (2020)and an advisor to The Trustees of Reservations (2002).

Political involvement  
According to Boston.com, Crate served as treasurer and a member of the executive committee of the Romney for President campaign in 2012, a role that he also held during the 2008 cycle. From 2003 to 2007, Crate served as the chairman of the Massachusetts Republican Party, and a senior advisor to Governor Mitt Rommney.

See also 
 List of Bates College people
 List of Columbia University people
 Massachusetts Republican Party

References

 

Living people
Bates College alumni
Columbia Business School alumni
Massachusetts Republican Party chairs
People from Beverly, Massachusetts
American chief financial officers
1967 births